John Morrill may refer to:
 John Morrill (baseball), American first baseman and manager in Major League Baseball
 John Morrill (historian), British historian and academic
 John A. Morrill, American state court judge in Maine